The fourth season of the Canadian science fiction–fantasy television series Sanctuary was commissioned by Syfy in January 2010.

Cast

Regular
 Amanda Tapping as Helen Magnus
 Robin Dunne as Will Zimmerman
 Ryan Robbins as Henry Foss
 Christopher Heyerdahl as Bigfoot / John Druitt

Recurring
 Jonathon Young as Nikola Tesla
 Ian Tracey as Adam Worth
 Robert Lawrenson as Declan McRae
 Pascale Hutton as Abby Corrigan
 Brian Markinson as Greg Addison
 Agam Darshi as Kate Freelander

Guest
 Peter Wingfield as James Watson
 Paul McGillion as Terrence Wexford
 Gil Bellows as Caleb

Episodes

Production
In January 2010, Syfy officially renewed Sanctuary for a fourth, 13-episode season, to air starting Autumn 2011. According to Tapping, producing a 13-part season was more practical than a 20-episode season, stating "I think 13 is a good number for us. Twenty was really hard. It was a great joy because we were able to flesh things out more. And I think had we been given more lead-up to starting our season, although we had a network pickup early. [...] We really only had five weeks to prep this entire season. And if we were doing 20, I think we'd all be in an insane asylum by now. Thirteen was like, we can do 13 with five weeks. There's no way we could've been prepared for 20." Robin Dunne has said that he will direct the sixth episode of the season, having had an interest in doing so. In describing what the fourth season would be about, Tapping stated the Hollow Earth story line would still be dealt with. She also requested that Magnus be given a love interest. The Sanctuary panel during the 2011 San Diego Comic-Con International revealed that there will be a musical episode sometime this season.

Broadcast and reception
The season returned to Friday nights and premiered on October 7, at 10 pm. The fourth season was the 64th most watched cable show in 2011, averaging 1.262 million viewers per episode and a 0.4 rating for viewers aged 18 to 49 years. It was up from the 997,000 average of the second half of the third season earlier in the year. However, ratings for the fourth season were down 13.44 per cent compared with the first half of season three in 2010.

References

External links
 
 List of Sanctuary episodes at The Futon Critic

Sanctuary (TV series)
2011 Canadian television seasons